Paulo Andrés Garcés Contreras (born 2 August 1984) is a Chilean footballer who plays for Chilean Segunda División club Deportes Valdivia as a goalkeeper.

Career

Garcés made his debut in 2003 against Santiago Wanderers in the closing championship at San Carlos de Apoquindo Stadium. He was loaned out to Deportes Puerto Montt in 2004 and 2007

After returning from the loan Deportes Puerto Montt, Universidad Católica loaned him to Lobos de la BUAP of Primera "A" of Mexican soccer. After his experience in Mexico, he returns to Chile to play in Everton de Viña del Mar team in which he was on the starting eleven sometimes. In 2009, he returns to Universidad Católica willing to win a place on the starting eleven of coach Marco Antonio Figueroa.

In 2013, he won the Apertura 2013–14 with O'Higgins. In the tournament, he played 16 matches receiving 12 goals; including the final versus Universidad Católica, where he was a key player after made saves in the final minutes.

In 2014, he won the Supercopa de Chile against Deportes Iquique, but did not play because he was called up for the Chile national team.

He participated with the club in the 2014 Copa Libertadores where they faced Deportivo Cali, Cerro Porteño and Lanús, being third and being eliminated in the group stage.

In 2021, after playing six matches for Primera B club San Luis de Quillota, he resigned. At the same year, he joined Deportes Valdivia in the Segunda División Profesional de Chile.

Personal life
Garcés is married with the model Joyce Castiblanco. The couple have three children: Florencia, Benjamín and Paulo.

Although his father, Patricio, was a goalkeeper, from his paternal line his relatives are mainly inclined towards arts and music: His older brother, Óscar, is an actor and former goalkeeper of Colo-Colo at youth level and both his younger brother, Miguel, and his cousins, Andrés de León (stage name of Christian Garcés) and Patricio Garcés, are singers.

Honours

Club
Universidad Católica
 Primera División de Chile: 2005–A, 2010

Universidad de Chile
 Primera División: 2012–A

O'Higgins
 Primera División: 2013–A
 Supercopa de Chile: 2014

Colo Colo
 Primera División: 2015–A

Individual
 2012 Copa Sudamericana Team of the Tournament
 2013 Jugador Experto Easy del Año
 Medalla Santa Cruz de Triana (1): 2014

References

External links
 
 
 

1984 births
Living people
People from Linares Province
People from Maule Region
Chilean footballers
Chile international footballers
Club Deportivo Universidad Católica footballers
Puerto Montt footballers
Lobos BUAP footballers
Everton de Viña del Mar footballers
Universidad de Chile footballers
Unión La Calera footballers
O'Higgins F.C. footballers
Colo-Colo footballers
C.D. Antofagasta footballers
Curicó Unido footballers
San Luis de Quillota footballers
Deportes Valdivia footballers
Chilean Primera División players
Ascenso MX players
Primera B de Chile players
Segunda División Profesional de Chile players
2011 Copa América players
2015 Copa América players
Copa América-winning players
Chilean expatriate footballers
Expatriate footballers in Mexico
Chilean expatriate sportspeople in Mexico
Chilean expatriates in Mexico
Association football goalkeepers